The 2010 NCAA Division I Field Hockey Championship was the 30th women's collegiate field hockey tournament organized by the National Collegiate Athletic Association, to determine the top college field hockey team in the United States. The Maryland Terrapins won its seventh championship, defeating the North Carolina Tar Heels in the final. The semifinals and championship were hosted by the University of Maryland at the Maryland Field Hockey & Lacrosse Complex in College Park, Maryland.

Bracket

References

External links
2010 Division I Field Hockey Championship – NCAA

2010
Field Hockey
2010 in women's field hockey
2010 in sports in Maryland